The 2010 IIHF World U20 Championship Division III took place in Istanbul, Turkey from January 4 to 10, 2010. The top two teams in the tournament were promoted to Division II for the 2011 IIHF World U20 Championship.

Preliminary round 
The top two teams in each group advanced to the semi-finals, while the remaining teams played for fifth to seventh place.

Group A

Group B

Final round

Non-Qualification Bracket

7th place playoff

5th place playoff

Qualification Bracket 

Semifinals

3rd place playoff

Final

Final standings

See also
 2010 World Junior Ice Hockey Championships
 2010 World Junior Ice Hockey Championships – Division I
 2010 World Junior Ice Hockey Championships – Division II

References

External links 
 IIHF.com

III
World Junior Ice Hockey Championships – Division III
International ice hockey competitions hosted by Turkey
Sport in Istanbul
Youth ice hockey in Turkey
World